Terminus may refer to:

 Bus terminus, a bus station serving as an end destination
 Terminal train station or terminus, a railway station serving as an end destination

Geography
Terminus, the unofficial original name of Atlanta, Georgia, United States
Terminus (office complex), an office complex in Atlanta
Lagos Terminus railway station, the main railway station of Lagos, Nigeria

Religion
Terminus (god), a Roman deity who protected boundary markers

Art, entertainment, and media

Books
Terminus (play), a 2007 play by Marl O'Rowe
"Terminus" (poem), written in 1866 by Ralph Waldo Emerson
Terminus (comics), a fictional character in the Marvel Universe
Terminus (planet), the home of the Foundation in Isaac Asimov's Foundation novels (1942–1993)
Terminus, a robot in the eponymous short story from Tales of Pirx the Pilot by Polish science fiction writer Stanisław Lem

Film and TV
Terminus (1961 film), a film directed by John Schlesinger
Terminus (1987 film), a film directed by Pierre-William Glenn
Terminus (2007 film), a short film directed by Trevor Cawood
Terminus (2015 film), a film directed by Marc Furmie
Terminus (Doctor Who), a 1983 serial in the long-running science fiction TV series Doctor Who
 Terminus, fictional city location in The Signal (2007 film)
Terminus, a fictional sanctuary located in a train station, depicted in season 4 of the TV series The Walking Dead
Terminus Series, a type of mecha in the anime series Eureka Seven
Terminus Systems, part of the world of the Mass Effect media franchise

Games
Terminus (1986 video game), a space prison escape game by Mastertronic
Terminus (2000 video game), a 2000 space-flight role-playing/action game by Vicarious Vision
Terminus, a location in Halo 4; also an achievement when the player finds it
 Terminus is the name of the world in RPG/TBS video game Ash of Gods: Redemption

Music
 Terminus (album)

Sciences 
 Glacier terminus, the end, or "snout," of a glacier's ice at any given point in time
 terminus post quem, terminus ante quem, terminus ad quem, and terminus a quo, terms used to describe the limits of a timeframe during which a historical event may have happened in archaeology
 Terminus (weevil), a beetle genus in the tribe Pentarthrini

Other uses 
 Leonard Rose (hacker), a.k.a. "Terminus", convicted hacker
 "Terminus", a finishing move of professional wrestler Damien Sandow
 Terminus, a font

See also 
Terminal (disambiguation)
Terminator (disambiguation)
Termini (disambiguation)